Giuseppe Ferrandino (born 21 March 1963, Ischia) is an Italian politician. He became a Member of the European Parliament in April 2018 and was re-elected in the 2019 EP election. Since 2018, Ferrandino has been serving on the Committee on Economic and Monetary Affairs. In addition to his committee assignments, he is a member of the Parliament's delegation to the Euro-Latin American Parliamentary Assembly (EuroLat).

References

Living people
1963 births
MEPs for Italy 2014–2019
MEPs for Italy 2019–2024
Democratic Party (Italy) MEPs
Democratic Party (Italy) politicians